KLM Royal Dutch Airlines is the flag carrier airline of the Netherlands. KLM is headquartered in Amstelveen, with its hub at nearby Amsterdam Airport Schiphol. It is part of the Air France–KLM group and a member of the SkyTeam airline alliance.

History

KLM was set up by Albert Plesman on 7 October 1919 and started operations on 19 May 1920. The first route served was the Amsterdam to London, flown with DH.9As that carried just two passengers on a charter basis. In 1926, the Rotterdam–Amsterdam–Copenhagen run was extended to Malmö.

By , Berlin, Hamburg and Liverpool were already part of the European route network. In  that year, KLM became the first airline that linked Continental Europe with the North of England, when the Amsterdam–Hull route was inaugurated; the Amsterdam–Liverpool service was re-routed via Doncaster in mid-1936. By , the following twenty-one lines were operative: Amsterdam–Berlin, Amsterdam–Bremen–Hamburg, Amsterdam–Christiansand–Oslo, Amsterdam–Copenhagen–Malmö, Amsterdam–Copenhagen–Norrköping–Stockholm, Amsterdam–Copenhagen–Stockholm, Amsterdam–Eindhoven, Amsterdam–Groningen–Leeuwarden–Amsterdam, Amsterdam–Leipzig–Budapest–Athens–Alexandria–Lydda–Baghdad–Basra–Jask–Karachi–Jodhpur–Allahabad–Calcutta–Rangoon–Bangkok–Penang–Medan–Singapore–Palembang–Batavia–Bandoeng that connected with KNILM services, Amsterdam–Manchester–Liverpool, Amsterdam–Twente, Amsterdam–Texel, Amsterdam–London, Amsterdam–Paris, Amsterdam–Rotterdam–Basle–Zurich, Amsterdam–Rotterdam–Cologne, Amsterdam–Rotterdam–Frankfort–Milan–Rome, Amsterdam–Rotterdam–Haamstede–Flushing–Knocke/Zoute, Amsterdam–Rotterdam–London, Amsterdam–Rotterdam–Prague–Vienna–Budapest, and Paris–Copenhagen–Stockholm.

Initially, these flights carried freight and mail, connected at Lisbon with Pan American Airways Clipper services to New York and had a subsidy from the Dutch Post Office.

List
KLM serves over 170 destinations across the world,  and 163 destinations during the winter 2022 season. Following is a list of destinations the airline and its subsidiaries KLM Cargo and KLM Cityhopper fly to according to their scheduled services.

See also
Air France-KLM
List of Air France destinations
List of KLM Cityhopper destinations
List of Martinair destinations
List of Martinair Cargo destinations
List of Transavia destinations
List of Transavia France destinations

References

External links
KLM destinations

Lists of airline destinations
Air France–KLM
SkyTeam destinations